Stuart J. Edelstein (born 1941) is a biophysicist, emeritus professor from the University of Geneva, professeur extraordinaire at the École Normale Supérieure and visiting scientist at the Babraham Institute.

His research focuses on the properties of allosteric proteins, which conformations and activities are affected by the binding of ligands. Using mathematical models and 3D structures, he studied the function of hemoglobin, solving the structure of mutant form leading to sickle-cell disease. He then turned his attention on the allosteric regulation of neurotransmitter receptors, in particular the nicotinic acetylcholine receptors in collaboration with Jean-Pierre Changeux.

Life

Stuart Edelstein received a PhD (1967) in Biochemistry from the University of California, Berkeley. After a post-doctoral training at the Pasteur Institute in the laboratory of Jacques Monod, he joined the faculty of Cornell University, where he became professor in 1977. He served as chairman of the Section of Biochemistry, Molecular and Cell Biology from 1978 to 1980.

He was a visiting scientist at the Weizmann Institute of Science (1974) and spent two sabbatical years (1980–1981 and 1984–1985) in Paris as Professeur associé at the University of Paris XII (Créteil) in the laboratory of Jean Rosa and as visiting scientist at the Pasteur Institute

In 1986  Edelstein moved as professor in the department of Biochemistry of the University of Geneva. He was  director of the department for the period 1987–1994. He served as president of the Swiss Biophysical Section (1994–1998) and president of the Swiss Committee of the International Union for Pure and Applied Biophysics. He returned to the Pasteur Institute in 1994 for a sabbatical leave in the laboratory of Jean-Pierre Changeux. He held the international chair at the Collège de France for the academic year 2002–2003.

In September 2006, Edelstein became professor emeritus at the University of Geneva. He continued research as a visiting scientist in several academic institutions, notably at the EMBL-European Bioinformatics Institute, the École Normale Supérieure and The Babraham Institute.

Awards and recognition

 2003, awarded the Legion of honour, rank chevalier 
 1998, elected foreign member of the French Academy of Sciences

Books  
 Jean-Pierre Changeux, Stuart J Edelstein. Nicotinic acetylcholine receptors: From Molecular Biology to Cognition. (2005) Odile Jacob ed. 
 Stuart J Edelstein. Des gènes et génomes. (2002) Odile Jacob ed. 
 Daniel M Bollag, Michael D Rozycki, Stuart J Edelestein. Protein Methods (1996) 
 Stuart J Edelstein. The Sickled Cell: From Myths to Molecules. (1986) Harvard University Press. 
 J M Widom, Stuart J Edelstein. Chemistry: An Introduction to General, Organic and Biological Chemistry. (1981) W.H.Freeman. 
 Stuart J Edelstein. Introductory biochemistry; fundamentals of cellular metabolism and molecular biology. (1973) Holden-Day.

References

External links
 Stuart Edelstein's page at the University of Geneva

Living people
1941 births
American biochemists